Amy Odell is an American writer and author.

Odell grew up in Austin, Texas. She graduated from New York University.

Books
ANNA: The Biography (2022)

Tales From the Back Row: An Outsider's View from Inside the Fashion Industry (Simon & Schuster, 2015)

References

External links

American writers
New York University alumni
Writers from Texas
Year of birth missing (living people)
Living people